The 2008 Ginetta G50 Cup was the inaugural Ginetta G50 Cup season. The season began at Oulton Park on 24 March and finished after 20 races over 10 rounds at Donington Park on 12 October, supporting rounds of the British Formula 3 Championship and British GT Championship.

Nigel Moore dominated the first year of the series, winning 14 races and finishing the season over 200 points ahead of runner up Frank Wrathall.

Teams and drivers

Calendar
All rounds were held in the United Kingdom.

Championship standings

(key)

References

External links
 Official website
 tsl-timing

Ginetta G50